A123 or variation may refer to:

 A123 Systems, battery manufacturer
 , Royal Fleet Auxiliary Ol-class fast fleet tanker of the British Royal Navy
 highway 123, see List of highways numbered 123
 OMB Circular A-123, a US Office of Management and Budget government circular that defines the management responsibilities for internal controls in Federal agencies.

See also
 123 (disambiguation)